Karl Fischer (24 March 1901 – 16 April 1958) was a German chemist.  In 1935 he published a method  to determine trace amounts of water in samples. This method is now called Karl Fischer titration and was originally performed manually but has been automated. It remains the primary method of water content determination used worldwide by government, academia and industry laboratories, including all major chemical manufacturers and petroleum refiners.

References

1901 births
1958 deaths
20th-century German chemists
Scientists from Munich